Dorset is a ceremonial county in England.

Dorset may also refer to:

Places 

 Dorset Council (Australia), a local government area in Tasmania, Australia
 Cape Dorset, Nunavut, Canada
 Dorset, Ontario, a small community located between the touristic Muskoka and Haliburton regions of Ontario, Canada
 Dorset Island, one of the Canadian Arctic islands located in Hudson Strait, Nunavut, Canada
 Dorset (district), a unitary district within the ceremonial county of Dorset, England, created in 2019
 Dorset (UK Parliament constituency), United Kingdom
 Dorset, Minnesota, United States
 Dorset, Ohio, United States
 Dorset, Vermont, United States

People 
 Marion Dorset (1872–1935), medical scientist who developed immunization procedures for swine fever and father of the purple meat stamp
 Ray Dorset (born 1946), British musician

Other uses 
 Dorset culture, a prehistoric culture that preceded the Inuit in Arctic North America
 Dorset (sheep) (disambiguation), several breeds of sheep
 Marquess of Dorset, a title in the Peerage of England

See also 
 Dorset Council (disambiguation)
 
 Dorsett, a surname